The Gongogi River (Portuguese:  Rio Gongoji) is a river of Bahia state in eastern Brazil.  It flows through the municipalities of Gongogi, Nova Canaã, Iguaí, and Itagibá.  It empties into the De Contas River

See also
List of rivers of Bahia

References
Brazilian Ministry of Transport

Rivers of Bahia